Boycho Petrov Velichkov (born 13 August 1958) is a former Bulgarian football forward.

Career
For the Bulgarian national team Velichkov featured in 45 games and scored 23 goals, also playing at the 1986 World Cup.

Most of Velichkov's club career was spent with Lokomotiv Sofia, winning the top Bulgarian league, once—in 1978. He also played for one year in French Le Havre AC and two seasons in Greek Panserraikos, scoring scored 39 goals. In October 2007 the Greek club declared Velichkov the "best foreign player in the club of all times".

Honours
Lokomotiv Sofia
Bulgarian League: 1977–78
Bulgarian Cup: 1981–82

References

1958 births
Living people
Bulgarian footballers
Bulgaria international footballers
Bulgarian expatriate footballers
Bulgarian football managers
Footballers from Sofia
FC Lokomotiv 1929 Sofia players
Le Havre AC players
Panserraikos F.C. players
Ligue 1 players
First Professional Football League (Bulgaria) players
1986 FIFA World Cup players
Expatriate footballers in France
Expatriate footballers in Greece
Bulgarian expatriate sportspeople in France
Bulgarian expatriate sportspeople in Greece
Association football forwards